R334 road may refer to:
 R334 road (Ireland)
 R334 road (South Africa)